Paraconger is a genus of eels in the family Congridae.  It currently contains the following species:

 Paraconger californiensis Kanazawa, 1961 (Californian conger)
 Paraconger caudilimbatus (Poey, 1867) (Margintail conger)
 Paraconger guianensis Kanazawa, 1961
 Paraconger macrops (Günther, 1870) (Blackspot conger)
 Paraconger notialis Kanazawa, 1961 (Guinean conger)
 Paraconger ophichthys (Garman, 1899)
 Paraconger similis (Wade, 1946) (Shorttail conger)

References

 

Congridae